Riccardo Balocco (30 March 1883 - ) was a general in the Royal Italian Army who commanded the V Corps during the World War II Axis invasion of Yugoslavia in April 1941.

Biography 

On 1 July 1937, he became a Division General and assumed command of the 12th Infantry Division "Sassari" between 9 September 1937 and 5 June 1940. 
He then became commander of the V Corps and participated in the invasion of Yugoslavia in April 1941, conquering and later occupying Croatia. 
On 18 February 1942, he was put on non-active.

Notes

References
 

Italian generals
Italian military personnel of World War II